Unghiul is a newspaper published in Ungheni, Moldova. It was co-founded in 1997 by Nicolae Sanduleac, who took over as director shortly after and managed the newspaper until his death in 2019.

The first issue was released on 20 July 1997.

References

External links 
 

1997 establishments in Moldova
Mass media in Ungheni
Newspapers established in 1997
Newspapers published in Moldova
Romanian-language newspapers published in Moldova